Juan Vallejo Corona (February 7, 1934 – March 4, 2019) was a Mexican serial killer who was convicted of the murders of 25 migrant farm workers found buried in peach orchards along the Feather River in Sutter County, California, United States in 1971. At the time, his crimes were characterized as among the most notorious in U.S. history. Until the discovery of Dean Corll's victims two years after his own conviction, Corona was the deadliest American serial killer by number of proven victims.

Corona was convicted of 25 counts of first-degree murder in 1973. An appellate court overturned the conviction in 1978 on the basis of incompetent legal representation and granted Corona a new trial. In 1982, he was again found guilty of all twenty-five homicides. He served out a life sentence in California State Prison, Corcoran and died in 2019.

Early life 
Juan Corona was born in Autlán, Jalisco, Mexico, on February 7, 1934, first entering the United States in 1950. Crossing the border into California at age 16, he picked carrots and melons in the Imperial Valley for three months before moving on north to the Sacramento Valley. His half-brother, Natividad Corona (–May 23, 1973), had immigrated to California in 1944 to work and settled at Marysville, across the Feather River from Yuba City.

In May 1953, Corona moved to the Marysville-Yuba City area at the suggestion of Natividad, finding work on a local ranch. He was first married to Gabriella E. Hermosillo on October 24, 1953, in Reno, Nevada. In 1959, he married Gloria I. Moreno and they had four daughters.

Mental illness 
In January 1956, after suffering what was thought to be a schizophrenic episode, Natividad had Corona committed to DeWitt State Hospital in Auburn, California, where he was diagnosed with "schizophrenic reaction, paranoid type." Corona received twenty-three shock treatments before being pronounced recovered and released three months later. He was deported to Mexico upon release.

Six years later, Corona was given a green card and returned to the United States legally. Aside from schizophrenic episodes and a reported violent temper, he was regarded as a hard worker. In 1962, the same year he returned to the U.S., he became a licensed labor contractor, being put in charge of hiring workers to staff the local fruit ranches.

In March 1970, Corona was again admitted to DeWitt State Hospital for treatment. A year later, in March 1971, he applied for welfare. His application was denied.

Evidence 
On May 19, 1971, a farm owner who had used Corona to contract field workers noticed a freshly dug hole in his peach orchard which was filled the next day. In the hole was found the body of a man who had been stabbed and hacked.

In one grave, deputies found two meat receipts bearing Corona's signature. In another two graves, there were two crumpled Bank of America deposit slips printed with Corona's name and address. This circumstantial evidence gave an added boost to the case.

Witnesses later told police that some of the victims had been last seen riding in Corona's pickup truck.

In the early morning hours of May 26, 1971, police entered Corona's Yuba City home with a search warrant and arrested him. Evidence indicating his guilt was discovered and seized, such as two bloodstained knives, a machete, a pistol and blood-stained clothing. There was also a work ledger that contained 34 names and dates, including seven of the known victims. The ledger came to be referred to as a "death list" by the prosecution, who alleged it recorded the dates the men were murdered.

Corona had been supplying workers to the ranches where the victims were discovered. He housed many of the men who worked for him in a bunkhouse on the Sullivan Ranch, where most of the victims were discovered.

Victims 
All of Corona's victims were middle-aged Caucasian male drifters between the ages of 47 and 64 (except 3), most of them had criminal records and all but one were stabbed or slashed with a knife or machete.

Legal proceedings 

Corona was provided legal aid and assigned a public defender, Roy Van den Heuvel, who hired several psychiatrists to perform a psychological evaluation. Although the sheriff, Roy Whiteaker, said the prisoner was in no apparent or immediate danger from his fellow townsmen, Corona was moved to the new and larger county jail in Marysville, on May 30, 1971, for "security reasons."

On June 2, Corona was returned to Sutter County for arraignment, which was closed to the media and public. A plea of not guilty was entered and a date was set for Corona's preliminary hearing.

By the time the search was terminated on June 4, a total of 25 male victims had been discovered. Four of them were unidentified.

On June 14, Van den Heuvel was replaced by Richard Hawk, a privately retained defense attorney. In return for his legal representation, an agreement was made granting Hawk exclusive literary and dramatic property rights to the defendant's life story, including the proceedings against him. Under the agreement, Corona waived the attorney–client privilege. Shortly after taking over the defense, and even before seeing Corona's medical record or reading any of the reports, Hawk decided against having him plead not guilty by reason of insanity and fired the psychiatrists.

Corona complained of chest pain from his cell in Yuba City, on June 18, and was taken to the hospital, where he was diagnosed with having had a mild heart attack. The grand jury returned a 25-count murder indictment against him on July 12. In early August, Corona was hospitalized again after complaining of chest pain and saying he had not been able to sleep because of it.

Trial 
It took over a year after the murders were discovered for the case against Corona to come to trial. The California Supreme Court voided the death penalty in the state on February 18, 1972, ruling it unconstitutional, cruel and unusual. Therefore, it would not be a capital case. Hawk succeeded in getting a change of venue from Sutter County, to Solano County.

The trial began on September 11, 1972, at the courthouse in Fairfield, California, more than 60 miles (100 km) from Yuba City. Jury selection took several weeks, and the trial another three months.

Though Corona denied culpability, he was not called to the stand to testify in his own defense and no defense witnesses were called. The jury deliberated for 45 hours and returned a verdict, on January 18, 1973, finding Corona guilty of first-degree murder on all 25 counts charged. The judge, Richard Patton, sentenced Corona to 25 terms of life imprisonment, to run consecutively, without the possibility of parole. Despite being sentenced to so many consecutive terms, the Department of Corrections said that Corona would be eligible for parole in seven years, citing section 669 of the penal code, which mandates that when a crime is punished by life imprisonment, with or without the possibility of parole, then all other convictions shall be merged and run concurrently.

Corona was first incarcerated at Vacaville's California Medical Facility, nine miles (14 km) from Fairfield, because of the heart irregularities. In 1973 he was stabbed 32 times in his cell because he had bumped into a fellow inmate in a corridor and failed to say 'excuse me.' Of the five men questioned, including the one involved in the bumping incident, one identified as the man's sexual partner and three inmates identified as friends of the partner, four were charged with assault with a deadly weapon.

Corona was transferred to Correctional Training Facility  (CTF), in Soledad, California. In 1974 his wife filed for divorce. It was granted on July 30.

Second trial 
On May 18, 1978,  the California court of appeal granted Juan Corona a new trial based on his Appeal and Petition for the Writ of Habeas Corpus filed by his lawyers, Alan Exelrod and Michael Mendelson. The Appeals Court based its decision on two primary issues raised by appellate counsel; first, trial counsel did not do the requisite legal and factual investigations required; second, trial counsel's obtaining publication rights as part of his fee created an impermissible conflict between trial counsel and Corona.

The second trial began on February 22, 1982, in Hayward, California. Corona's defense posited that the real murderer of the ranch workers was most likely Natividad Corona, a known homosexual who was accused of attacking Romero Raya at his cafe in Marysville, and, after losing the lawsuit Raya filed, had fled back to his native Mexico. Natividad had died eight years earlier in Guadalajara.

This time around, more than 50 defense witnesses were called to the stand by Hallinan. Corona was called in his own defense. He was asked only two questions, through an interpreter, taking only two minutes. "Do you understand the state has accused you of killing 25 men?" "Yes", Corona answered, almost inaudibly. "Did you have anything to do with killing those men?" "No", Corona replied. Hallinan then turned Corona over to the prosecutor, Ronald Fahey, for cross-examination. Startled prosecution attorneys requested a brief recess to gather their wits and prepare some of the more than 630 exhibits for their cross. Later, Fahey questioned Corona about various vans and cars he used at the ranch where he worked and where he lived, in which some weapons were found.

The trial lasted seven months. Corona was again convicted of the crimes on September 23, 1982, and returned to prison after the strategy failed to persuade the jury, which deliberated for 54 hours over a two-week period, of his innocence. Afterward, the foreman told the press that the most incriminating piece of evidence against Corona was his work ledger, for which the labor contractor had "no reasonable explanation." He said the jury had dismissed the defense contention that Natividad committed the murders. "He wasn't in Marysville enough to have committed the bulk of the killings", he said.

Later years and death 
Corona was transferred from CTF at Soledad to Corcoran State Prison, Corcoran, California, in 1992, where he served a life sentence in the Sensitive Needs Yard (SNY), because he had dementia. He was denied parole eight times.

Corona died on March 4, 2019, aged 85, from natural causes.

See also 
 List of serial killers in the United States
 List of serial killers by number of victims

References

Further reading 
Cray, Ed. Burden of Proof: The Case of Juan Corona. New York: Macmillan, 1973. 
Kidder, Tracy. The Road to Yuba City: A Journey into the Juan Corona Murders. New York: Doubleday, 1974. 
Villaseñor, Victor. Jury: The People vs. Juan Corona. Massachusetts: Little Brown, 1977. 
Talbitzer, Bill. Too Much Blood. New York: Vantage Press, 1978. 
Cartel, Michael. Disguise of Sanity: Serial Mass Murderers. California: Pepperbox Books, 1985. <small>

1934 births
2019 deaths
20th-century criminals
Criminals from California
Male serial killers
Mexican emigrants to the United States
Mexican people convicted of murder
Mexican people imprisoned abroad
Mexican prisoners sentenced to life imprisonment
Mexican serial killers
People convicted of murder by California
People from Autlán, Jalisco
People from Marysville, California
People from Yuba City, California
People with schizophrenia
Prisoners sentenced to life imprisonment by California
Prisoners who died in California detention
Serial killers who died in prison custody
Violence against men in North America